Sandro Iashvili (born 3 January 1985) is a retired Georgian football striker.

References

1985 births
Living people
Footballers from Georgia (country)
Expatriate footballers from Georgia (country)
Georgia (country) international footballers
Erovnuli Liga players
FC Dinamo Tbilisi players
FC Thun players
FC Anzhi Makhachkala players
Expatriate footballers in Switzerland
Expatriate footballers in Russia
Association football forwards